Cynthia Erin Mosley (born October 1, 1975) is an American former soccer player. A midfielder, she played for the Suzuyo Shimizu F.C. Lovely Ladies of Japan's L. League and won two caps for the senior United States women's national soccer team.

In college soccer with the Notre Dame Fighting Irish, Daws scored a record 61 goals and won the Hermann Trophy, the Honda Sports Award as the nation's top female soccer player, and the Honda-Broderick Cup as the nation's top female athlete. She married former Notre Dame football player Emmett Mosley IV and had four children: Jalyn, Emmett V, Trent and Grant West Hills-born Daws suffered from a persistent foot injury.

References

Living people
1975 births
American women's soccer players
Notre Dame Fighting Irish women's soccer players
United States women's international soccer players
American expatriate women's soccer players
Soccer players from California
Expatriate women's footballers in Japan
American expatriate sportspeople in Japan
Suzuyo Shimizu FC Lovely Ladies players
Nadeshiko League players
Women's association football midfielders
People from West Hills, Los Angeles
Hermann Trophy women's winners